Folke Andersson (born 19 February 1903) was a Swedish ice hockey player. Andersson was part of the Djurgården Swedish champions' team of 1926.

References

1903 births
Djurgårdens IF Hockey players
Swedish ice hockey players
Year of death missing